Septin 4 is a protein that in humans is encoded by the gene SEPTIN4. The gene is 2,698 base pairs long, contains one gt-ag intron, and is oriented on the minus strand of DNA. The pre-messenger has 2 exons and the predicted protein is 570 amino acids long. There are currently no experimental structures for the SEPTIN4 gene product with a sequence identity >90%.

Protein properties 
Although SEPTIN4 is predicted to be an intracellular protein, its exact location is unknown. There is some confidence that the subcellular locations of SEPTIN4 include the cytosol, the nucleus, and mitochondrion. C17orf47 contains a domain of unknown function DUF4655, which has a length characteristic of that DUF family  There are three predicted regions of low complexity in SEPTIN4. These regions of low complexity may contain stress-response related terms which involve flexible binding for specific functions. There are three known polymorphic SNPs in SEPTIN4. There are 6 sites of post-translational modification supported by multiple records, according to Phosphosite.

The gene is 2,698 base pairs long, contains one gt-ag intron, and is oriented on the minus strand of DNA. The pre-messenger has 2 exons and the predicted protein is 570 amino acids long. There are currently no experimental structures for the SEPTIN4 gene product with a sequence identity >90%.

Homology 
Sixty-eight other organisms, mostly mammals, have orthologs with SPETIN4.

Expression 

There is positive differential mRNA and protein expression of SEPTIN4 in normal tissue of testis. Specifically, nucleolar expression of the gene product occurs in the seminiferous ducts of the testis. While SEPTIN4 is not currently associated with any diseases, several cases of carcinoids displayed strong SEPTIN4 expression via staining with HPA028424 antibody provided by Sigma-Aldrich. Polyphen predicts C17orf47 variants to be benign.

During a study on the endocytic system, a weak but specific association with SEPTIN4 in the regulation of endocytosis was found. Knockdown of SEPTIN4 caused decreased epidermal growth factor endocytosis as well as decreased transferrin endocytosis. In another experiment, knockdown of SEPTIN4 resulted in decreased infection of cells by vaccinia virus.

Predicted structure

References